Diana Dumbrava is a Romanian film actress, better known for her portrayal in 2003 film Maria. She was nominated for European Film Award for Best Actress for the film.

Filmography
The Dot Man (2017) as Turcu
Roxanne (2013) as Roxana
Highschool in Less Than 54 Hours (2011) as Cristina
California Dreamin' (2007) as Doiaru's Mother
Orient Express (2004)
Maria (2003)

TV Shows
Umbre (2017)
Adina (2008)

References

Romanian film actresses
Romanian television actresses
People from Bacău
1966 births
Living people